Neelambuj Vats (born 24 November 1995) is an Indian cricketer. He made his first-class debut for Tripura in the 2018–19 Ranji Trophy on 30 December 2018, taking his first five-wicket haul in the first innings. He made his Twenty20 debut on 11 November 2019, for Tripura in the 2019–20 Syed Mushtaq Ali Trophy.

References

External links
 

1995 births
Living people
Indian cricketers
Tripura cricketers
Place of birth missing (living people)